Franco Emiliano Racca (born 15 January 1992) is an Argentine former professional footballer who played as a centre-back.

Career
Racca's career started with local club Sarmiento. He featured thirty-two times and scored three goals across the 2011–12 and 2012–13 seasons in Torneo Argentino B. In June 2013, Racca was signed on loan by Primera B Metropolitana's Chacarita Juniors. Twenty-six appearances followed, which preceded the club signing him permanently on 30 June 2014. He subsequently scored his first goal for them, netting during a draw with Villa Dálmine on 23 September in a campaign which ended with promotion to Primera B Nacional. After nineteen months in tier two, Racca was loaned to Deportivo Morón in 2016.

He made his debut for Deportivo Morón on 30 August in the Copa Argentina against Newell's Old Boys, before scoring for the first time during a Primera B Metropolitana fixture with Platense as they went on to win the 2016–17 title. Racca remained with Morón until June 2019. Upon returning to Chacarita, Racca was immediately loaned back out again to Atlético de Rafaela. He made sixteen appearances and scored three goals; versus Santamarina, Instituto and Quilmes. Racca's loan with Rafaela expired in June 2020, with the defender subsequently announcing his retirement from professional football.

Career statistics

Honours
Deportivo Morón
Primera B Metropolitana: 2016–17

References

External links

1992 births
Living people
Sportspeople from Córdoba Province, Argentina
Argentine footballers
Association football defenders
Torneo Argentino B players
Primera B Metropolitana players
Primera Nacional players
Chacarita Juniors footballers
Deportivo Morón footballers
Atlético de Rafaela footballers